Brandsøy is a village in Kinn Municipality in Vestland county, Norway. It is located on both sides of small strait that separates the east end of the island of Brandsøya and the mainland.

References

Villages in Vestland
Kinn